Deensen is a municipality in the district of Holzminden, in Lower Saxony, Germany.

The internationally well knowned sculptor Ursula von Rydingsvard was born there.

References

Holzminden (district)